Lutcher Theater is a privately owned, 1,450-seat, non-profit performing arts facility located at 707 Main Street in Orange, Texas.  It was built in 1980 and is the largest Performing Arts Series from Houston, Texas, to New Orleans, Louisiana, with annual attendance at approximately 30,000 adults and children.

Features
The six-story Lutcher Theater is the tallest building in downtown Orange. It has 1,450 seat accommodations, with 870 on the main level and 567 in the balcony. If necessary, the orchestra pit can be lowered to accommodate a 1,450-person audience. The stage itself is 45'W x 30'H x 35'10"T. The sound system is an EAW AX series system with left, right, and center clusters. The theater is handicap accessible and offers headphones for the hearing impaired.

Performances
Since its opening with Liberace in February 1980, the theater has hosted only the best in big name entertainment. It serves as a showplace for a range of performing arts productions, from traveling Broadway plays to musical groups to one-man acts. 

Notable performances include:

Chris Botti
Lyle Lovett and His Large Band
Jim Brickman
Marcel Marceau
Ray Charles
Victor Borge
The Pirates of Penzance
David Copperfield
Glenn Miller Orchestra
42nd Street
Biloxi Blues 
Singin' in the Rain
The Music Man 
Sweet Charity
Cabaret
Shirley Jones
Dreamgirls
Barbara Mandrell
Driving Miss Daisy
Steel Magnolias
Little Shop of Horrors
My Fair Lady
Lost in Yonkers
Trisha Yearwood
Cats
Grease
The Sound of Music
West Side Story
Fiddler on the Roof
The King and I
Footloose
Tom Chapin
Death of a Salesman
La bohème
Rent
Willie Nelson
Riverdance
B. B. King
Clint Black: Up Close and Personal 
Evita
Hairspray
Annie
Marvin Hamlisch 
Movin’ Out
Skillet
Decyfer Down

Educational programs
Lutcher Theater's Series for Kids is one of the largest Children's Performing Series in Texas and the largest kids’ series in the Southeast Texas area. Performances are given by National and International performing arts touring companies. The series includes popular children's shows such as Old Yeller and The Velveteen Rabbit. The performances are held during the week for students on field trips and even include a study guide so teachers can incorporate the shows into their lessons.

The Nelda C. and H. J. Lutcher Stark Foundation
The Nelda C. and H.J. Lutcher Stark Foundation is a private foundation established in 1961 in Orange, Texas. It aims to improve the quality of life in Southeast Texas by encouraging, promoting, and assisting education, the arts, and health and human services. It carries out its mission through the Stark Museum of Art, the W. H. Stark House, Lutcher Theater, and Shangri La Botanical Gardens and Nature Center. These programs offer the community a rich resource for study and enjoyment of the arts, history, and nature.

References

External links 
  The Official website of the Lutcher Theater
  The Official website of The W. H. Stark Foundation
  The Official website of the W. H. Stark House
  The Official website of the Shangri La Botanical Gardens
  The Official website of The Stark Museum of Art

Theatres in Texas
Buildings and structures in Orange County, Texas
Tourist attractions in Orange County, Texas